Maledicta, The International Journal of Verbal Aggression, was an academic journal dedicated to the study of offensive and negatively valued words and expressions, also known as maledictology. Its main areas of interest were the origin, etymology, meaning, use, and influence of vulgar, obscene, aggressive, abusive, and blasphemous language. It was published from 1977 until 2005. The publisher, founder, and editor-in-chief was Reinhold Aman (April 8, 1936 – March 2, 2019).

Further reading

External links 
  (last archived version on May 13, 2019)

Works about profanity
Linguistics journals
Publications established in 1977
English-language journals
Publications disestablished in 2005
Defunct journals